is an unconventional sumo wrestling technique, which involves a wrestler clapping his hands together in front of his opponent's face at the tachi-ai (start of the bout). The aim of this technique is to cause the opponent to close his eyes briefly, allowing the instigator to gain the advantage.

Nekodamashi requires there to be a fair amount of space between the wrestlers at the tachi-ai. Using the technique is also a gamble: if it miscarries, it leaves the wrestler wide open to his opponent's attack.

Nekodamashi is not listed as a kimarite (winning technique); even in the unlikely situation that a wrestler is so surprised by a nekodamashi that he falls over, the winning technique is simply recorded as higi (non-technique victory).

Famous sumo wrestlers to have used the nekodamashi over the years include Mainoumi, Ōtsukasa, yokozuna Hakuhō in November 2015, and former yokozuna Mienoumi.

See also
Glossary of sumo terms

Sumo terminology